Elgandal Fort is situated amidst palm groves on the banks of the Manair River (a tributary of the Godavari River), approximately  from Karimnagar on the Sircilla Road in the Indian state of Telangana.
It was once under the control of the Qutub Shahi dynasty, the Mughal Empire, and the Nizams of Hyderabad. During the Nizam era it was the headquarters of Karimnagar.

History

Originally known as Veligundula, Elgandal is a  hillfort built of during the Kakatiya dynasty (1083–1323) and served as a stronghold for the warrior Musunuri Nayaks. The Qutb Shahi dynasty occupied the fort in the 16th century and posted Quinamul Mulk as commander. Subsequently, it fell under the administrative control of the Mughal Empire. Amin Khan was appointed as Khiledar of Elagandal during the reign of Nizam of Hyderabad Asaf Jah I (r. 1724–1748) followed by Muqarrab Khan. Mirza Ibrahim dhamsa became Khiledar during the reign of Nawab Salabat Jung. Dhamsa rebuilt and strengthened the fort in 1754 during the reign of Sikandar Jah (r.1803-1823). Bahadur Khan and Karimuddin served as Khiledars. 

While reorganizing the districts, the Sixth Nizam, Mir Mahbub Ali Khan, shifted the District Headquarters from Elagandal to Karimnagar in 1905.

The site also houses a mosque and an eidgah, the designated place for special Eid prayers.

Notable sites
Elagndal village is located 15 km from Karimnagar. This is a historical place.
The places to visit in Elagandal village include
 The fort on a hill called as Elagandal khilla
 Brindavan tank outside the eastern gateway of the fort, built by Zafar-ud-Doula in 1754, with minarets that oscillate when shaken
 "Dho Minar"

DoMinar built by Muslim kings (Nizams), has two tall pillars and the height of the pillars is approximately equal to that of Hyderabad Charminar.

See also 
Musunuri Nayaks
Salabat Jung
Asaf Jahi dynasty

References

External links
 https://web.archive.org/web/20080206122935/http://www.elgandal.com/
  IndianNGOs.com
 The Hindu article.

Forts in Telangana